Azulejo (from the Arabic al-zillīj) is a form of Spanish and Portuguese painted tin-glazed ceramic tilework. Azulejos are found on the interior and exterior of churches, palaces, ordinary houses, schools, and nowadays, restaurants, bars and even railways or subway stations. They are an ornamental art form, but also had a specific functional capacity like temperature control in homes.

There is also a tradition of their production in former Spanish and Portuguese colonies in North America, South America, the Philippines, Goa (India), Lusophone Africa, East Timor, and Macau (China). Azulejos constitute a major aspect of Spanish architecture and Portuguese architecture to this day and are fixtures of buildings across Spain and Portugal and its former territories. Many azulejos chronicle major historical and cultural aspects of Spanish and Portuguese history.

History

13th to 15th century
The word azulejo (as well as the Ligurian laggion) is derived from the Arabic  (al-zillīj): zellij, meaning "polished stone" because the original idea was to imitate the Byzantine and Roman mosaics. This origin shows the unmistakable Arab influences in many tiles: interlocking curvilinear, geometric or floral motifs. The craft of zellige is still in use in the Arab world in two main traditions the "Egyptian Zalij" and the "Moroccan Zellige", the latter being the most famous.

The Spanish city of Seville became the major centre of the Hispano-Moresque tile industry. The earliest azulejos in the 13th century were alicatados (panels of tile-mosaic). Tiles were glazed in a single colour, cut into geometric shapes, and assembled to form geometric patterns. Many examples can be admired in the Alhambra of Granada. The old techniques of cuerda seca ('dry string') and cuenca developed in Seville in the 15th century
These techniques were introduced into Portugal by King Manuel I after a visit to Seville in 1503. They were applied on walls and used for paving floors, such as can be seen in several rooms, and especially the Arab Room of the Sintra National Palace (including the famous cuenca tiles with the armillary sphere, symbol of king Manuel I). The Portuguese adopted the Moorish tradition of horror vacui ('fear of empty spaces') and covered the walls completely with azulejos.

16th century
Potters from Italy came into Seville in the early 16th century and established workshops there. They brought with them the maiolica techniques which allowed the artists to represent a much larger number of figurative themes in their compositions. The first Italian potter to move into Spain was Francisco Niculoso who settled in Seville in 1498. Examples of his work can still be admired in situ in the Alcazar of Seville. Under the influence of the Renaissance style introduced by Italians artists, most azulejos were polychrome tile panels depicting allegorical or mythological scenes, scenes from the lives of saints or the Bible, or hunting scenes. Mannerism and the grotesque style, with its bizarre representations, had much influence on azulejos.

Until the mid-16th century the Portuguese continued to rely on foreign imports, mostly from Spain, such as the Annunciation by Francisco Niculoso in Évora, but also on a smaller scale from Antwerp (Flanders), such as the two panels by Jan Bogaerts in the Paço Ducal of Vila Viçosa (Alentejo). One of the early Portuguese masters of the 16th century was Marçal de Matos, to whom Susanna and the Elders (1565), in Quinta da Bacalhoa, Azeitão, is attributed, as well as the Adoration of the Shepherds (in the National Museum of Azulejos in Lisbon). The Miracle of St. Roque (in the Church of S. Roque, Lisbon) is the first dated Portuguese azulejo composition (1584). It is the work of Francisco de Matos, probably the nephew and pupil of Marçal de Matos. Both drew their inspiration from Renaissance and Mannerist paintings and engravings from Italy and Flanders. A fine collection of 16th-century azulejos (azulejos Hispano-mouriscos) can be found in the Museu da Rainha D. Leonor in Beja, Portugal (the former Convento da Conceição).

In the late 16th century, checkered azulejos were used as decoration for large surfaces, such as in churches and monasteries. Diagonally placed plain white tiles were surrounded by blue square ones and narrow border tiles.

17th century
Shortly afterwards, these plain white tiles were replaced by polychrome tiles (enxaquetado rico) often giving a complex framework such as in the Igreja de Santa Maria de Marvila in Santarém, Portugal with one of the most outstanding tile-based interior decorations in Portugal.

When the diagonal tiles were replaced by a repetitive pattern of horizontal polychrome tiles, one could obtain a new design with different motifs, interlacing Mannerist drawings with representations of roses and camellias (sometimes roses and garlands). An inset votive usually depicts a scene from the life of Christ or a saint. These carpet compositions (azulejo de tapete), as they were called, elaborately framed with friezes and borders, were produced in great numbers during the 17th century. The best examples are to be found in the Igreja do Salvador, Évora, Igreja de S. Quintino, Obral de Monte Agraço, Igreja de S. Vicente, Cuba (Portugal) and the university chapel in Coimbra.

The use of azulejos for the decoration of antependia (front of an altar), imitating precious altar cloths, is typical for Portugal. The panel may be in one piece, or composed of two or three sections. They were used in the 16th, 17th and 18th centuries. Some antependia of the 17th century imitate oriental fabrics (calico, chintz). The golden fringes of the altar cloth were imitated by yellow motifs on the painted border tiles. Excellent examples can be found in the Hospital de Santa Marta, Lisbon, or in the Convent of Santa Maria de Almoster and the Convento de Santa Cruz do Buçaco.

During the same period another motif in friezes was introduced: floral vases flanked by birds, dolphins or putti, the so-called albarradas. They were probably inspired by Flemish paintings of flower vases, such as by Jan Brueghel the Elder. These were still free-standing in the 17th century, but they would be used in repetitive modules in the 18th century.

Azulejos dating from 1642 are in the Basilica and Convent de San Francisco de Lima, Peru.)

Another type of azulejo composition, called aves e ramagens ('birds and branches'), came into vogue between 1650 and 1680. They were influenced by the representations on printed textiles that were imported from India: Hindu symbols, flowers, animals and birds.

In the second half of the 17th century, the Spanish artist Gabriel del Barco y Minusca introduced into Portugal the blue-and-white tiles from Delft in the Netherlands. The workshops of Jan van Oort and Willem van der Kloet in Amsterdam created large tile panels with historical scenes for their rich Portuguese clients, such as for the Palace of the Marqueses da Fronteira in Benfica, Lisbon. But when King Peter II stopped all imports of azulejos between 1687 and 1698, the workshop of Gabriel del Barco took over the production. The last major production from Holland was delivered in 1715. Soon large, home-made blue-and-white figurative tiles, designed by academically trained Portuguese artists, became the dominant fashion, superseding the former taste for repeated patterns and abstract decoration.

18th century
The late 17th and early 18th centuries became the 'Golden Age of the Azulejo', the so-called Cycle of the Masters (Ciclo dos Mestres). Mass production was started not just because of a greater internal demand, but also because of large orders came in from the Portuguese colony of Brazil. Large one-off orders were replaced by the less expensive use of repetitive tile patterns. Churches, monasteries, palaces and even houses were covered inside and outside with azulejos, many with exuberant Baroque elements.

The most prominent master-designers in these early years of the 18th century were: António Pereira (artist), Manuel dos Santos, the workshop of António de Oliveira Bernardes and his son Policarpo de Oliveira Bernardes; the Master PMP (only known by his monogram) and his collaborators Teotónio dos Santos and Valentim de Almeida; Bartolomeu Antunes and his pupil Nicolau de Freitas. As their production coincided with the reign of King João V (1706–1750), the style of this period is also called the Joanine style.

During this same period appear the first 'invitation figures' (figura de convite), invented by the Master PMP and produced in the 18th and 19th centuries. These are cut-out panels of azulejos with life-size figures (footmen, halberdiers, noblemen or elegantly dressed ladies), usually placed in entrances of palaces (see Palácio da Mitra), patios and stair landings. Their purpose was to welcome visitors. They can only be found in Portugal.

In the 1740s the taste of Portuguese society changed from the monumental narrative panels to smaller and more delicately executed panels in Rococo style. These panels depict gallant and pastoral themes as they occur in the works of the French painter Antoine Watteau. The mass-produced tiles acquired a more stereotypic design with predominant polychrome irregular shell motifs.

The reconstruction of Lisbon after the great earthquake of 1755 gave rise to a more utilitarian role for decoration with azulejos. This bare and functional style would become known as the Pombaline style, named after the Marquis of Pombal, who was put in charge of rebuilding the country. Small devotional azulejo panels started to appear on buildings as protection against future disasters.

In Mexico, a large producer of Talavera—a Mexican maiolica, there are several instances of the use of azulejos on buildings and mansions. One particular mansion, the Casa de los Azulejos in Mexico City, was built in 1737 for the Count and Countess of El Valle de Orizaba. Ceramic making traditions were imported to Mexico in the early 16th century and have flourished.

As a reaction, simpler and more delicate Neoclassical designs started to appear with more subdued colours. These themes were introduced in Portugal by the engravings of Robert and James Adams. The Real Fábrica de Louça do Rato, with the master-designer Sebastião Inácio de Almeida and the painter Francisco de Paula e Oliveira, became in this period an important manufacturer of the characteristic so-called Rato-tiles. Another important tile painter in this period was Francisco Jorge da Costa.

With great Portuguese influence, the city of São Luís, in Maranhão, in Brazil, preserves the largest urban agglomeration of azulejos from the 18th and 19th centuries, throughout Latin America. In 1997, the Historic Center of São Luís was declared a World Heritage Site by UNESCO. São Luís is also known as "Cidade dos Azulejos".

19th century
In the first half of the 19th century, there was a stagnation in the production of decorative tiles, owing first to the incursion of the Napoleonic army and later to social and economic changes. When around 1840 immigrant Brazilians started an industrialized production in Porto, the Portuguese took over the Brazilian fashion of decorating the façades of their houses with azulejos. While these factories produces high-relief tiles in one or two colours, the Lisbon factories started using another method: the transfer-print method on blue-and-white or polychrome azulejos. In the last decades of the 19th century, the Lisbon factories started to use another type of transfer-printing: using creamware blanks.

While these industrialized methods produced simple, stylized designs, the art of hand-painting tiles was not dead, as applied by Manuel Joaquim de Jesus and especially Luís Ferreira. Luis Ferreira was the director of the Lisbon factory Viúva Lamego and covered the whole façade of this factory with allegorical scenes. He produced panels, known as Ferreira das Tabuletas, with flower vases, trees, and allegorical figures, applying the trompe-l'œil technique. These hand-painted panels are fine examples of the eclectic Romantic culture of the late 19th century.

Mid-19th century, in England, in addition to encaustic tiles and mosaics, the Mintons factory also produced azulejos.

20th century
At the start of the 20th century, Art Nouveau azulejos started to appear from artists such as Rafael Bordalo Pinheiro, Júlio César da Silva and José António Jorge Pinto. In 1885 Rafael Bordalo Pinheiro founded a ceramics factory in Caldas da Rainha, where he created many of the pottery designs for which this city is known. In this factory he has his own a museum São Rafael devoted to his fantastically imaginative work, especially the decorative plates and his satirical stone figures, such as the Zé Povinho (a representation of the worrying common man).

Around the 1930s, Art Deco-azulejos made their appearance with their principal artist António Costa. The monumental decorations, consisting of 20,000 azulejos, in the vestibule of the São Bento railway station in Porto, created by Jorge Colaço, show in its historical themes the narrative style of the romantic 'picture-postcard'. This one of the most notable creations with azulejos of the 20th century. The façades of the churches of Santo Ildefonso and Congregados equally attest to the artistic mastery of Jorge Colaço. Other artists from this period include Mário Branco and Silvestre Silvestri, who decorated in 1912 the lateral façade of the Carmo Church, and Eduardo Leite for his work on the Almas Chapel (imitating the style of the 18th century), both in Porto.

20th-century artists include Jorge Barradas, Carlos Botelho, Jorge Martins, Sá Nogueira, Menez and Paula Rego. Maria Keil designed the large abstract panels in the initial nineteen stations of the Lisbon Underground (between 1957 and 1972). Through these works she became a driving force in the revival and the updating of the art of the azulejo, which had gone in some decline. Her decorations of the station Intendente is considered a masterpiece of contemporary tile art.

The Museu Nacional do Azulejo in Lisbon houses the largest collection of Portuguese tiles in the world.

Lisbon Metro

Azulejo tiles are present in almost every station in the Lisbon Metro system.
Initially, painter Maria Keil (1914–2012), wife of metro system architect Francisco Keil do Amaral (1910–1975) created the works for the Metro stations.

A new expansion, completed in 1988, featured works by more contemporary Portuguese artists: Rolando de Sá Nogueira in Laranjeiras, Júlio Pomar in Alto dos Moinhos, Manuel Cargaleiro in Colégio Militar/Luz, and Maria Helena Vieira da Silva in Cidade Universitária. Following on from this, many artists have been commissioned to decorate new and refurbished stations.

Pieces

Traditions
Hispano-Moresque ware (Spanish)
Talavera de la Reina pottery (Spanish)
Manises pottery (Spanish)
Paterna pottery (Spanish)
Talavera pottery (Mexican)
Uriarte Talavera (Mexican)
El Puente del Arzobispo pottery (Spanish)

State of protection
Tiles are vulnerable to vandalism, neglect and theft due to their prevalence and relative ease of access in historic and often decaying buildings across Portugal. In Lisbon, tiles can sometimes be found for sale in street fairs and the black market, despite recent efforts to raise awareness among buyers, that are mainly foreign tourists. Since 2013 it is forbidden to demolish buildings with tile-covered façades. The highest number of thefts occurs in the capital, Lisbon, and authorities estimate that 25% of artistic tiles in that city was lost between 1980 and 2000.

The main azulejo protection group in Portugal, SOS Azulejo, created in 2007 and working as a dependency of Polícia Judiciária, has identified the limitation and control of the sale of ancient tiles in those markets as their main goal. The city of Lisbon has created the 'Banco do Azulejo' (tile bank), which collects and stores around 30 thousand tiles from demolished or condemned buildings and from donations. Similar projects exist in the cities of Aveiro, Porto and Ovar.

In August 2017, a new law was put in place in order to prevent both the demolition of tile-covered buildings and renovation work that includes the removal of tiles, even if they affect only the building's interior.

See also
National Museum of the Azulejo
Portuguese architecture
Spanish architecture
Zellige

References

Sources
 Morales, Alfredo J. – Francisco Niculoso Pisano, Arte Hispalense, Diputación de Sevilla, 1977, 1991
 dos Santos Simões, J. M. – Azulejaria em Portugal nos séculos XV e XVI : introdução geral, Calouste Gulbenkian Foundation, 2nd ed., Lisbon, 1990 (in Portuguese)
 Costa, Vania – Azulejo, Accessible Travel Magazine, September 2006
 Meco, José – O Azulejo em Portugal, Alfa, Lisbon, 1988 (in Portuguese)
 Castel-Branco Pereira, João – Portuguese tiles from the National Museum of Azulejo, Lisbon, 1995, 
 Turner, J. – Tile – History and Uses, Portugal in Grove Dictionary of Art, MacMillan, 1996, 
 The Rough Guide to Portugal – 11th edition March 2005 – 
 Rentes de Carvalho J. – Portugal, um guia para amigos – in Dutch translation: Portugal – De Arbeiderspers, Amsterdam, 9th ed., August 1999 
 Mucznik, Sonia. – The Azulejos of Lisbon
 Sabo, Rioleta; Falcato, Jorge. N. and photographs by Nicolas Lemonnier – Portuguese Decorative Tiles, New York, London and Paris, 1998; 
 Barros Veloso, A. J.; Almasqué, Isabel – Portuguese Tiles and Art Nouveau / O Azulejo Portugués ea Arte Nova, Edições Inapa, Portugal, 2000;

External links

 A catalog with many of the historical azulejos in Spain and Portugal with their creation date and details
 National Azulejo Museum, Portugal
 An illustrated history of the azulejo
 The over-glaze decoration technique
 Introduction to the azulejos by the Instituto Camoes (in Portuguese)

 
Wallcoverings
Types of pottery decoration
Tiling
Portuguese traditions